Residence Brusilia is a curved building in the Schaerbeek district of Brussels, Belgium, next to Josaphat Park. It was designed by the Belgian architect Jacques Cuisinier and built from 1970 to 1974.

The upper floors offer a wide view over Brussels and beyond (as far north as Antwerp and Doel Nuclear Power Station on a clear day). Originally the building was supposed to be double the width. The left half was built first, together with the foundations of the right half, but the right tower was postponed sine die because of the first oil crisis. In 2014, a lower building was completed in a different style on the right foundations.

References

External links 

 Brusilia on SkyscraperPage
 Brusilia on Emporis

Schaerbeek
Buildings and structures completed in 1967
Buildings and structures in Brussels
Skyscrapers in Belgium
Residential skyscrapers